United Nations Security Council resolution 1205, adopted unanimously on 5 November 1998, after recalling all resolutions on Iraq, particularly resolutions 1154 (1998) and 1194 (1998) concerning its weapons programme, the Council condemned Iraq's decision to cease co-operation with the United Nations Special Commission (UNSCOM).

On 31 October 1998 Iraq decided to end co-operation with UNSCOM and continued to place restrictions on the International Atomic Energy Agency (IAEA). The country was required to meet its obligations under Resolution 687 (1991) and that effective co-operation with UNSCOM and the IAEA is essential in this process. It would then consider measures imposed on Iraq once it had rescinded its latest decision.

Acting under Chapter VII of the United Nations Charter, the Council condemned Iraq's decision to no longer co-operate with the Special Commission and IAEA and demanded that it immediately withdraw its decision. The country had previously announced it would suspend co-operation with both on 5 August 1998. Until Iraq complied, the duration of restrictions imposed in Resolution 687 would not be reviewed.

See also
 Foreign relations of Iraq
 Iraq and weapons of mass destruction
 Iraq disarmament timeline 1990–2003
 Sanctions against Iraq
 List of United Nations Security Council Resolutions 1201 to 1300 (1998–2000)

References

External links
 
Text of the Resolution at undocs.org

 1205
 1205
1998 in Iraq
Iraq and weapons of mass destruction
 1205
November 1998 events